The 1983 ICF Canoe Slalom World Championships were held in Meran, Italy under the auspices of International Canoe Federation for a record-tying third time, matching the record set by Spittal, Austria (1963, 1965, 1977). It was the 18th edition. Meran hosted the event previously in 1953 and 1971. The mixed C2 event was discontinued and the program remained unchanged until the 2009 Championships.

Medal summary

Men's

Canoe

Kayak

Women's

Kayak

Medals table

References
Official results
International Canoe Federation

Icf Canoe Slalom World Championships, 1983
ICF Canoe Slalom World Championships
International sports competitions hosted by Italy
Icf Canoe Slalom World Championships, 1983
Canoeing and kayaking competitions in Italy